Guy-America Airways, Inc. was an airline operating scheduled passenger flights between New York City and Georgetown, Guyana. For a very short time, the company flew to Europe under the name American Overseas Airlines.

According to its September 1, 1981 timetable, the airline operatined three round trip nonstop flights a week between New York City and Georgetown and was offering "the only non-stop" service.

Destinations

Georgetown (Cheddi Jagan International Airport)

New York City (John F. Kennedy International Airport) Hub

Fleet
4 Boeing 707-123B N519GA, N7583A, N7586A, N7588A
4 Boeing 707-321B N707GE, N498GA, N893PA (leased), N895PA (leased)
1 Douglas DC-8-62 N39307 (never in commercial service)

See also
 List of defunct airlines of the United States

References

Defunct airlines of the United States
Airlines established in 1981
Airlines disestablished in 1984